When Hope Calls is an American drama television series. The series is a spin-off of Hallmark Channel's When Calls the Heart, which is based on the Canadian West book series by Janette Oke. It premiered on August 30, 2019 as the inaugural original programming on Hallmark Movies Now, the Hallmark Channel's digital streaming service, with new episodes being released through October 25, 2019. The series was subsequently aired on Hallmark Channel in early 2020. The series was renewed for a second season and premiered on Great American Family on December 18, 2021.

Premise
The series follows Lillian and Grace, originally introduced in When Calls the Heart: The Greatest Christmas Blessing, as two orphaned sisters, who were separated when Lillian was seven and Grace was five. The two reunite as adults and open an orphanage in a small northwest town. The period piece is set in 1916 in the western Canadian town of Brookfield. Mountie Gabriel has a romantic interest in Lillian. Chuck, a rancher turned veterinarian, is the object of Grace's flirtations, much to the dismay of his dubious mother, Tess Stewart.

Cast and characters

Main
 Morgan Kohan as Lillian Walsh, Grace's older sister who was adopted at a young age and separated from Grace
 Jocelyn Hudon as Grace Bennett (season 1), Lillian's younger sister who grew up in an orphanage; Grace departs for London at the end of the first season, and is revealed to have stayed and married there in "A Country Christmas".
 RJ Hatanaka as Constable Gabriel "Gabe" Kinslow, the local Mountie in town
 Greg Hovanessian as Charlie "Chuck" Stewart (season 1),  Tess' son, and a rancher and the town veterinarian; it is revealed he left town after Grace did in "A Country Christmas".
 Wendy Crewson as Tess Stewart, Chuck's mother, who owns the big local ranch
 Hanneke Talbot as Maggie Parsons (recurring, season 1; main, season 2), the town nurse who is newly arrived to Brookfield
 Marshall Williams as Sam Tremblay (recurring, season 1; main, season 2), a drifter into town who works as a handyman for Lillian at the orphanage
 Neil Crone as Ronnie Stewart (recurring, season 1; main, season 2), Chuck's uncle and Tess's brother-in-law who runs the local hotel
 Lori Loughlin as Abigail Stanton (season 2), an acquaintance of Lillian's, she is a kind woman from Hope Valley

Recurring
 Isaak Bailey as Christian (season 1), an orphan at the orphanage
 Michael Copeman as Ken Newsome, a unfriendly old man
 Liam MacDonald as Vincent, an older orphan at the orphanage
 Kate Moyer as Sophia (season 1), an orphan at the orphanage.
 Riley O'Donnell as Helen (season 1), an older orphan at the orphanage who is searching for her grandfather, and who goes to live with him in "Where Hope Goes".
 Kim Roberts as Pearl Mayfair (season 1), a resident of Brookfield who owns a bakery
 Elizabeth Saunders as Eleanor Winters (season 1), the orphanage's housemother
 Simon Webster as Fred (season 1), a curious young orphan at the orphanage
 Ava Weiss as Mary Louise, an orphan at the orphanage
 Jefferson Brown as Joe Moody, the owner of Brookfield's general store
 Kelly Martin as Ruth, a worker at the post office
 Jonathan Potts as Ben Mendelson
 Morgan David Jones as Hank, a ranch hand on the Stewart ranch
 Kalinka Petrie as Lucie Clay, Chuck's childhood friend who may be romantically interested in him; she is later named the "foreman" at the Stewart ranch by Tess.

Guest stars
 Pascale Hutton as Rosemary "Rosie" LeVeaux Coulter, an acquaintance of Grace's from Hope Valley (in "From the Ashes")
 Kavan Smith as Leland "Lee" Coulter, another acquaintance of Grace's from Hope Valley (in "From the Ashes")
 Rob Stewart as Tom Clay, a rancher from outside of town (in "Lost and Found" and "House in Order")
 Kevin McGarry as Nathan Grant, the Mountie from Hope Valley (in "The Search", "House in Order", and "Where Hope Goes")
 Emily Anderson as Eve Gardiner, Grace's old friend from the orphanage who is passing through town on her way to New York City (in "About a Girl")
 Carter Ryan Evancic as Cody Stanton, Abigail Stanton's son (in "A Country Christmas, Parts 1 & 2")
 Kyana Teresa as Debbie Mayfair, Pearl Mayfair's daughter who is running the bakery while Pearl is out of town. (in "A Country Christmas, Parts 1 & 2") 
 Daniel Lissing as Jack Thornton, a deceased constable who was a good friend of Abigail's. She dreams about him. (in "A Country Christmas, Part 2")

Episodes

Series overview

Season 1 (2019)

Season 2 (2021)

Production
When Hope Calls is a spin-off of the long running prime time series When Calls the Heart. Primary filming is at Powassan, Ontario, Canada. It is executive produced by Alfonso Moreno, Brian Bird, Brad Krevoy, Susie Belzberg Krevoy, Michael Landon Jr., Amanda Phillips Atkins, Jimmy Townsend, and Eric Jarboe. Confirmation of the project, the Hallmark Network's inaugural streaming series, was announced February 9, 2019 as part of Crown Media Family Networks' bi-annual Television Critics Association Winter Press Tour.

On September 29, 2021, it was reported that the series had renewed for a second season, but would now be broadcast on GAC Family. It was also reported that When Calls the Heart actress Lori Loughlin would appear in the second season premiere, in her first television acting appearance since her arrest for her role in the 2019 college admissions bribery scandal.

Release
When Hope Calls premiered in back-to-back double episodes on August 30, 2019 on the Hallmark Movies Now network digital streaming service. The first season was re-broadcast on Hallmark Channel starting in February 2020. A second season premiered on December 18, 2021, and is broadcast on GAC Family instead of being released by Hallmark.

Notes

References

External links
 
 Preview: When Hope Calls, Hallmark Channel.

2019 American television series debuts
2010s American drama television series
Hallmark Channel original programming
Period family drama television series
Television shows filmed in Vancouver